White village may refer to:

Leuke Kome, (lit. "White Village" in Greek), former Nabataean port city in Saudi Arabia
White Towns of Andalusia, a series of towns in Spain.

See also
Racial segregation